Karl "Kalle" Anshelm Ansén (26 July 1887 – 20 July 1959) was a Swedish football player who competed at the 1908 and 1912 Olympics. In 1912 he played as forward one match in the main tournament as well as one match in the consolation tournament.

References

External links

 
 
 
 Swedish squad in 1912
 
 
 

1887 births
1959 deaths
Swedish footballers
Sweden international footballers
AIK Fotboll players
Olympic footballers of Sweden
Footballers at the 1908 Summer Olympics
Footballers at the 1912 Summer Olympics
Association football forwards
Footballers from Stockholm